Tunisian Victory is a 1944 Anglo-American propaganda film about the victories in the North Africa Campaign.

The film follows both armies from the planning of Operation Torch and Operation Acrobat (the latter of which was canceled), to the liberation of Tunis. Interspersed in the documentary format are the narrative voices of supposed American and British soldiers (voiced by Burgess Meredith and Bernard Miles respectively), recounting their experience in the campaign. Miles and Meredith, playing the roles of soldiers, talk separately until the end of the film when they have a dialogue, agree to co-operate after the end of the war, and with the other Allied nations create a more just and peaceful post-war order.

The film was intended as a follow-up to the successful British documentary film Desert Victory (1943). Frederic Krome's article "Tunisian Victory" and Anglo-American Film Propaganda in World War II from The Historian details the acrimony between the British and US film makers on the project. Most of the actual American combat footage taken during Operation Torch was destroyed when the ship carrying it was sunk, requiring many "battle scenes" to be reshot in the U.S. by director John Huston. Huston restaged several battles and liberations to achieve high quality footage, even going so far as to film some air battle scenes (in the Mohave Desert) and in Orlando, Florida. The British recognized the dubious nature of the film, though they themselves were guilty of the same recreations in wartime propaganda films.

The direction of the final version involved no less than five individuals: Frank Capra, John Huston, Anthony Veiller, Hugh Stewart and Roy Boulting.

See also 
 List of Allied propaganda films of World War II
The True Glory (1945)
 Army Film and Photographic Unit

References

External links 
 
 
 
 "Tunisian Victory and Anglo-American Film Propaganda in World War II" http://www.encyclopedia.com/doc/1G1-18516915.html

1944 films
American World War II propaganda films
British World War II propaganda films
British documentary films
American documentary films
North African campaign films
Films directed by Frank Capra
Films directed by Roy Boulting
Films scored by William Alwyn
American black-and-white films
Films directed by John Huston
1944 documentary films